Shooting, for the 2015 Island Games, takes place at the Crabbe Fullbore, Les Landes, Lecq ABT and Lecq Skeet ranges in Jersey. Competition took place from 27 June to 3 July 2015.

Medal table

Medal summary

Men's events

Women's events

Open events

Other events

References

2015 in shooting sports
2015 Island Games
Shooting at the Island Games